Siv Widerberg (12 June 1931 – 24 December 2020) was a Swedish writer and journalist. She received an honorary doctorate from the University of Umeå.

Widerberg was born in Bromma. She worked as a teacher (1951–1955) and as a journalist (1955–1965) before becoming a freelance writer. She was a member of the Swedish Academy for Children's Books. Widerberg died on Christmas Eve 2020.

Works

Prizes 
 1968 – Litteraturfrämjandets stipendiat
 1978 – Nils Holgersson-plaketten
 1983 – Astrid Lindgren-priset
 2001 – Gulliver-priset
 2007 – Rebells Fredspris
 2011 – Eldsjälspriset

References 
 Vem är vem i svensk litteratur.

Notes

External links
rabensjogren.se

1931 births
2020 deaths
20th-century Swedish women writers
20th-century Swedish journalists
Swedish women journalists
Journalists from Stockholm